Lansium parasiticum, commonly known as langsat,  lanzones, or longkong in English; duku in Indonesian or dokong in Terengganu Malay, is a species of tree in the Mahogany family with commercially cultivated edible fruits. The species is native to Southeast Asia. Despite its name, it is not parasitic.

Description
The trunk grows in an irregular manner, with its buttress roots showing above ground. The tree's bark is a greyish colour, with light and dark spots. Its resin is thick and milk coloured.

The pinnately compound leaves are odd numbered, with thin hair, and 6 to 9 buds at intervals. The upper edge shines, and the leaves themselves have pointed bases and tips. The stems of the buds measure .

The flowers are located in inflorescences that grow and hang from large branches or the trunk; the bunches may number up to 5 in one place. They are often branched at their base, measure  in size, and have short fur. The flowers are small, with short stems, and have two genders. The sheathe is shaped like a five lobed cup and is coloured a greenish-yellow. The top of the stamen is round. The pistil is short and thick.

Fruits look much like small potatoes and are borne in clusters similar to grapes. The larger fruits are on the variety known as duku. It is covered by thin, yellow hair giving a slightly fuzzy aspect. With the skin removed, the fruit resembles peeled garlic in appearance, with half a dozen white, translucent lobes, some of which contain a flat, bitter tasting seed. The seeds are covered with a thick, clear-white aril that tastes sweet and sour. The taste has been likened to a combination of grape and grapefruit and is considered excellent by most. The sweet juicy flesh contains sucrose, fructose, and glucose. For consumption, cultivars with small or undeveloped seeds and thick aril are preferred.

Cultivars

There are numerous cultivars of L. parasiticum. Overall, there are two main groups of cultivars, those named duku and those named langsat. There are also mixed duku-langsat varieties.

Those called duku generally have a large crown, thick with bright green leaves, with short bunches of few fruit. The individual fruit are large, generally round, and have somewhat thick skin that does not release sap when cooked. The seeds are small, with thick flesh, a sweet scent, and a sweet or sour taste.

Meanwhile, the variant commonly known as langsat generally has thinner trees, with a less dense crown consisting of dark green leaves and stiff branches. The bunches are longer, and each bunch holds between 15 and 25 large, egg-shaped fruit. The skin is thin and releases a white sap when cooked. The flesh is watery and tastes sweet and sour.

Lansium domesticum var. aquaeum is distinguished by its hairy leaves, as well as the tightly packed dark yellow fruit on its bunches. The fruit tends to be small, with thin skin and little sap; the skin is difficult to remove. To be eaten, the fruit is bitten and the flesh sucked through the hole created, or rubbed until the skin breaks and the seeds are retrieved. In Indonesia the fruit has several names, including kokosan, pisitan, pijetan, and bijitan. The seeds are relatively large, with thin, sour flesh.

Reproduction
The seeds of L. parasiticum are polyembryonic, the multiple embryos resulting from apomixis.

Lansium parasiticum is traditionally reproduced by spreading seedlings, either cultivated or collected from below the tree. It has been said that new seedlings require 20 to 25 years to bear fruit, with the possibility of the quality being inferior. However other sources quote 12 years to first production from seed and no variations.  Production often varies from year to year, and depends to some extent on having a dry period to induce flowering.  One example of ten trees in Costa Rica about twenty-five years old produced during five years the following weights of salable fruits: 2008: 50 kilos, 2009: 2000 kilos, 2010: 1000 kilos, 2011: 100 kilos, 2012: 1500 kilos.  Experiments in the Philippines with grafting where two trees are planted close to each other and then grafted when one to two meters tall to leave twin root systems on a single main trunk have resulted in earlier and less erratic fruit production.

Another common method is by air layering. Although the process requires up to several months, the new rooted tree produced is itself ready to bear fruit within two years. Trees cultivated with this method have a high death rate, and the growths are less resilient.

The third common way to reproduce L. parasiticum is with grafting. This results in the new trees having the same genetic characteristics as their parent, and being ready to bear fruit within 5 to 6 years. The offspring are relatively stronger than transplanted shoots.

Ecology

Lansium parasiticum grows well in mixed agroforests. The plant, especially the duku variant, prefers damp, shaded areas. It can be grown in the same agroforest as durian, petai, and jengkol, as well as wood-producing trees.

The plant can grow and blossom in latosol, yellow podzol, and alluvium. The plant prefers slightly acidic soil with good drainage and rich in mulch. The langsat variant is hardier, and can weather dry seasons with a little shade and water. The plant cannot handle floods.

Lansium parasiticum generally bears fruit once a year. This period can vary between areas, but blooming is generally after the beginning of the rainy season and fruit production some four months later.

Distribution
Lansium parasiticum is native to the Malesian phytochorion of Southeast Asia, from Peninsular Thailand and Peninsular Malaysia, to Java, Sumatra, Borneo, the Philippines (Luzon, Camiguin, Basilan, and Mindanao), Sulawesi, the Moluccas, and Western New Guinea.

It has also been introduced to Laos, Cambodia, Myanmar, Micronesia, Hawaii, Sri Lanka, India, the Seychelles, Trinidad and Tobago, and Suriname, among others.

The tree is cultivated commercially in Thailand (langsat), Cambodia, Vietnam, India, Malaysia and the Philippines (Philippine Spanish: lanzones). It grows well in the wetter areas (120 inches/3 meters or more annual rainfall) of Costa Rica, where it is still very rare, having been introduced decades ago by the United Fruit Company. A major hindrance to its acceptance seems to be that it is very slow in bearing, said to take 12 years or more from seed. However, air layering from mature trees, as well as grafting, are said to work well and produce much faster.

The name Duku is reserved for the larger-sized varieties of Langsat, near the size of golf balls, claimed sweeter and with less sap in the peel.  A variety called Dokong exported to mainland Malaysia from Thailand (this variety is called 'Longkang'  in Thailand) grows tighter in the clusters, giving it a faceted shape, and is preferred by many over the standard Langsat.

Uses

Lansium parasiticum is cultivated mainly for its fruit, which can be eaten raw. The fruit can also be bottled in syrup. The wood is hard, thick, heavy, and resilient, allowing it to be used in the construction of rural houses.

Some parts of the plant are used in making traditional medicine. The bitter seeds can be pounded and mixed with water to make a deworming and ulcer medication. The bark is used to treat dysentery and malaria; the powdered bark can also be used to treat scorpion stings. The fruit's skin is used to treat diarrhea, and in the Philippines the dried skin is burned as a mosquito repellent. The skin, especially of the langsat variety, can be dried and burned as incense.

The greatest producers of Lansium parasiticum are Indonesia, Thailand, the Philippines and Malaysia. The production is mostly for internal consumption, although some is exported to Singapore, Hong Kong and Kuwait.

See also
Dysoxylum parasiticum
Lychee
Longan

References

External links

Lansium domesticum at Tree Functional Attributes and Ecological Database (World Agro Forestry)

Meliaceae
Tropical fruit
Fruits originating in Asia
Trees of Indo-China
Trees of Malesia
Fruit trees